John Chapman (October 18, 1740January 27, 1800) was a member of the United States House of Representatives from Pennsylvania.

Chapman was born in Wrightstown Township in the Province of Pennsylvania. He was commissioned justice of the peace February 25, 1779, and was one of the justices commissioned judge of the court of common pleas of Bucks County the same year.  He moved to Upper Makefield Township, Pennsylvania, prior to 1776.  He was a member of the Pennsylvania General Assembly from 1787 to 1796.

He was a member of the revived American Philosophical Society, elected in 1768.

Chapman was elected as a Federalist to the Fifth Congress.  He died in Upper Makefield Township in 1800.  Interment in the Friends’ Burying Ground in Wrightstown Township.

References

Sources

1740 births
1800 deaths
People from Bucks County, Pennsylvania
Federalist Party members of the United States House of Representatives from Pennsylvania
Members of the Pennsylvania House of Representatives
18th-century American politicians